"OK boomer" or "okay boomer" is a catchphrase and internet meme that has been used by Millennials and Gen Z to dismiss or mock attitudes typically associated with baby boomers – people born in the two decades following World War II. The phrase first drew widespread attention due to a November 2019 TikTok video in response to an older man, though the phrase had been coined years before that. Considered by some to be ageist, the phrase has developed into a retort for resistance to technological change, climate change denial, marginalization of members of minority groups, or opposition to younger generations' values.

The phrase has also been used commercially to sell merchandise and has been the subject of multiple trademark applications.

Origin 
The first recorded instance of "OK boomer" is in a Reddit comment on 29 September 2009, and it appeared in 2015 on 4chan. "OK boomer" reached mass popularity in late 2019 as a reaction to an unidentified older man's rant on TikTok condemning "infantile" younger generations "hobbled" by social media and participation trophies. He said, "millennials and Generation Z have the Peter Pan syndrome [...] they don't ever want to grow up [and] they think that the utopian ideals that they have in their youth are somehow going to translate into adulthood". Thousands of viewers responded with "OK boomer" as "a sophisticated, mass retaliation" against the impact of past generations.

Usage 
The phrase has been used as a retort for perceived resistance to technological change, climate change denial, marginalization of members of minority groups, or opposition to younger generations' ideals. Various media publications have noted the meme's usage on social media platforms beyond TikTok, and The New York Times wrote that "teenagers use it to reply to cringey YouTube videos, Donald Trump tweets, and basically any person over 30 who says something condescending about young peopleand the issues that matter to them." , videos tagged with #OkBoomer on TikTok had been viewed about 4 billion times.

In early November 2019, while giving a speech supporting a climate change bill, New Zealand MP Chlöe Swarbrick claimed that the average age of parliamentarians was 49 years old, and Gen X MP Todd Muller interrupted her, to which she responded "OK boomer". She wrote in an article in The Guardian that her comment "symbolised exhaustion of multiple generations." Swarbrick received widespread support on social media, as well as criticism for allegedly promoting ageism, including by the MP Christopher Bishop.

A July 2019 song titled "OK boomer" fuelled the meme like an anthem, with cutting lyrics. During halftime of the Harvard-Yale football game on 23 November 2019, climate change protesters interrupted the game by rushing the field and remained even after they were asked to leave, instead chanting "OK boomer."

On 9 January 2020, during the Jeopardy! The Greatest of All Time tournament, "OK boomer" was the answer to a 400-point question in the "OK" category: "A 2019 New York Times article says this 2-word phrase 'marks the end of friendly generational relations'." Ken Jennings elicited laughter from the audience with the response, "I get to say it to Alex! What is 'OK, boomer'?" The phrase was used by US Supreme Court Chief Justice John Roberts on 15 January 2020, as part of questioning for the Babb v. Wilkie age discrimination case.

On 2 March 2020, streamer Neekolul posted a video of lip-syncing and dancing to the Senzawa song "Oki Doki Boomer" while wearing a Bernie 2020 shirt. With more than 6 million views in four days and more than 30 million that month, the video has been described by viewers as both cute and cringey.

Commercialization
Multiple trademark applications were filed for "OK boomer", including one from Fox Media in 2019 with the intent to launch "an ongoing television series featuring reality competition, comedy, and game shows".

Reception
Many reactions have been positive. According to India Ross of the Financial Times, the phrase has "come to symbolise a generational cultural fracture" with attacks on its use from baby boomers perhaps only serving to increase its power and use. Clémence Michallon of The Independent applauded the phrase as "just the right amount of dismissive" while warning against its overuse. Miyo McGinn of Grist applauded the term, writing, "This joy undeniably stems from righteous indignation as much as simple amusement—the two words feel downright poetic after years of hearing my generation blamed for 'killing' everything from restaurant chains to department stores to relationships." Some have commented that the term should be considered a shorthand term for "The Establishment" rather than targeting a specific age group.

Some commentators have considered the phrase to be ageist. The conservative radio host Bob Lonsberry went as far as labeling the word "boomer" as "the N-word of ageism" in a widely criticized and soon deleted tweet. Furthermore, Lonsberry stated that "being hip and flip does not make bigotry OK, nor is a derisive epithet acceptable because it is new". The Late Show with Stephen Colbert mocked him: "Clearly this fella needs to play the hot new game: 'Is This The New N-Word?' No, it's not. Thank you for playing." Francine Prose of The Guardian suggested that the phrase reflects general cultural acceptance of discrimination against older generations. Also writing for The Guardian, Bhaskar Sunkara criticized the meme and said that baby boomers instead "need solidarity" because many "older workers and retirees are struggling to survive" as "half of Americans approaching age 65 have less than $25,000 in savings". In an interview, AARP executive Myrna Blyth told Axios, "OK, millennials. But we're the people that actually have the money." Several French politicians have also accused the phrase of being ageist, with MP Audrey Dufeu Schubert (La République en Marche!) deeming it an ageist slur in a special report on "succeeding in bridging the generational gap and fighting ageism".

"OK boomer" was one of the top five words for the year 2019 as selected by readers of a blog published on PublicAddress.net.  It was nominated for a similar designation by a university in Switzerland, landing in second place. The phrase is on Lake Superior State University's 45th annual Banished Words List.

Variations

OK zoomer 
Some writers and critics of the "OK boomer" meme have responded with their own generational hostilities, particularly aimed towards the "digital natives" of Generation Z who are sometimes referred to as "zoomers." Columnist Cosmo Landesman, writing for The Spectator, retorted that the Internet-heavy culture of zoomers lacked substance compared to that of the boomers, and would eventually be rejected by the children of Generation Z: "I suspect that future generations will want to stick the boot into the boomers too, but Generation Z will provoke nothing but a yawn. Their children will look at them and their infatuation with the latest bit of digital technology, roll their eyes and declare: OK zoomer." Viviana Freyer, staff editor of The Bi-College News, the student newspaper of Bryn Mawr and Haverford College, responded to these kinds of criticisms in an editorial, writing that "When it is our turn to take the heat from “Generation Alpha” and whatever generation comes next, we hopefully will understand that this comes with getting older, and we’ll take the jokes with more grace than some thirty-something on Twitter getting overly defensive over side parts or cursive." American television comedian Bill Maher also took aim at what he described as a sense of impatience and moral superiority among Generation Z's activists such as environmentalist Greta Thunberg, in a "New Rule" segment for his HBO current events program Real Time titled "OK Zoomer."

OK groomer 

The term "groomer" refers to a person who forms close, trusting relationships with children and/or their families or caregivers in order to prime minors for abusive sexual behaviour. Originally, "OK groomer" was a statement of backlash by viewers against YouTube personality Onision, who had been accused of grooming practices targeting his young fans, and was even the subject of a documentary produced by television journalist Chris Hansen, best known for the Dateline NBC series of primetime TV specials entitled "To Catch a Predator". Later on, however, the context of "OK groomer" has evolved to become a reactionary statement by those opposed to sex- and gender-focused instruction of children in schools, and a broader inclusion of sex- and gender-based content in mass media marketing and popular culture aimed at youth. It has gained particularly common usage among those who also support the controversial revisions to curriculum in the state of Florida signed into law by Governor Ron DeSantis in 2022, which critics have referred to as "Don't Say Gay" legislation. Proponents of the Florida law and other legislative proposals like it, which seek to curtail or diminish discussion of sex- and gender-oriented content in classrooms, have described educators and activists looking to include or promote such material as "groomers" for what is believed to be a foisting of inappropriate and explicit content upon a captive audience of young children and impressionable teenagers who look upon teachers and other adult figures as people to trust. Writing for The American Conservative, senior editor Rod Dreher criticized the Walt Disney Company's vocal opposition to the Florida law, and a gradual inclusion over the years of LGBTQ-focused content in Disney productions, promotional marketing materials, and theme park attractions (such as "Disney Pride"), as being an example of institutional "grooming" by a major corporate brand that is synonymous with children's entertainment and innocence. Mary Harrington, contributing editor at British politics and culture website UnHerd, also defended the use of the term as a critique of what she described as a normalization of the sexualization of children being framed as a progressive civil-rights struggle. Research from the Harvard Law School's Cyber Law Clinic tracking the use of the "OK groomer" phrase on Twitter noted that its use began to surge in early 2022, reaching a peak of 7,959 mentions on 29 March of that year, one day after the Florida bill became law.

See also 

 A group where we all pretend to be boomers
 "Don't trust anyone over 30"
 Gammon (insult)
 Generationism
 Generation snowflake
 Intergenerational conflict
 Kids these days
 Me generation
 List of Generation Z slang

References 

Age-related stereotypes
Ageism
Baby boomers
Catchphrases
Cultural generations
Internet memes introduced in 2019
Pejorative terms for people
Youth culture
2010s neologisms